Rahmede  is a river of North Rhine-Westphalia, Germany. It rises in Lüdenscheid, flows through the tortuous Rahmedetal and flows near Altena in the Lenne.

See also
List of rivers of North Rhine-Westphalia

References

Rivers of North Rhine-Westphalia
Rivers of Germany